The BRM Hepworth GB-1 was a British sports prototype race car, designed, developed, and built by British constructor BRM, for the North American Can-Am sports car racing series. It was crashed during practice testing at Riverside in 1980, and never raced. It was itself based on the unraced BRM P230 Formula One car.

References

Sports prototypes
Can-Am cars